The Carbon Copy Silver Lining is the independent debut album of the Texas-based progressive rock band Fair to Midland. It was recorded in January 2001, but released at the end of the year or the following year. The album was reissued in late 2011 in a very limited run, as a part of pre-order bundles for the band's first DVD release, "Welcome to the Dirt".

Track listing

Personnel
Fair to Midland
 Darroh Sudderth — vocals
 Cliff Campbell — guitars
 Nathin Seals — bass
 Jason Pintler — drums

Session musicians
 Brett Stowers — percussion
 Matt Langley — guest keyboards on "Informative Timeline" and "Pen-_-'"
 Alex Johnson — guest vocals on "Pen-_-'"

2001 debut albums
Fair to Midland albums
Self-released albums